The Hwasong-10, also known by the names BM-25 and Musudan, is a mobile intermediate-range ballistic missile developed by North Korea. Hwasong-10 was first revealed to the international community in a military parade on 10 October 2010 celebrating the Workers' Party of Korea's 65th anniversary, although experts believe these were mock-ups of the missile. Hwasong-10 resembles the shape of the Soviet Union's R-27 Zyb submarine-launched missile, but is slightly longer. It is based on the R-27, which uses a 4D10 engine propelled by unsymmetrical dimethylhydrazine (UDMH) and nitrogen tetroxide (NTO). These propellants are much more advanced than the kerosene compounds used in North Korea's Scuds and Nodong missiles.

Since April 2016 the Hwasong-10 has been tested a number of times, with two apparent partial successes and a number of failures.
The Hwasong-10 was not shown in the April 2017 and February 2018 military parades, suggesting that the design had not been deployed.

Assuming a range of 3200 km, the Musudan could hit any target in East Asia (including US military bases in Guam 
and Okinawa). Inventory is less than 50 launchers.

Development
In the mid-1990s, after the collapse of the Soviet Union, North Korea invited the Makeyev Design Bureau's ballistic missile designers and engineers to develop this missile, based on the R-27 Zyb. In 1992, a large contract between Korea Yon’gwang Trading Company and Makeyev Rocket Design Bureau of Miass, Russia  was signed. The  agreement stated that Russian engineers  would go to the DPRK and assist in the development of the Zyb Space Launch Vehicle (SLV).

It was decided that, as the Korean People's Army's MAZ-547A/MAZ-7916 Transporter erector launcher could carry 20 tonnes, and the R-27 Zyb was only 14.2 tonnes, the R-27 Zyb's fuel/oxidizer tank could be extended by approximately 2 metres. Additionally, the warhead was reduced from a three-warhead MIRV to a single warhead.

The actual rocket design is a liquid fuel rocket, generally believed to use a hypergolic combination of unsymmetrical dimethylhydrazine (UDMH) as fuel, and nitrogen tetroxide (NTO) as oxidizer. Once the fuel/oxidizer combination are fed into the missile, it could maintain a 'ready to launch' condition for several days, or even weeks, like the R-27 SLBM, in moderate ambient temperatures. A fueled Hwasong-10 would not have the structural strength to be safely land transported, so would have to be fueled at the launch site.

It was originally believed that the rocket motors of Hwasong-10 were the same as those within the second stage of the Taepodong-2, which North Korea unsuccessfully test fired in 2006. However analysis of the Unha-3 launch, believed to be based on the Taepodong-2, showed that the second stage did not use the same fuel as the R-27, and is probably based on Nodong rocket technology.

Before its test flight it was believed that there was a possibility that the Hwasong-10 would use the Nodong's kerosene and corrosion inhibited red fuming nitric acid (IRFNA) propellants, reducing the missile's range by about half.

However it is unlikely that North Korea uses IRFNA propellants which would reduce its range by about half, after the experts acknowledged that the 22 June 2016 test could have had a range of 3,150 km if the missile was not launched in the lofted trajectory.

Iranian Khorramshahr

North Korea sold a version of this missile to Iran under the designation BM-25. The number 25 represents the missile range (2500 km). The Iranian designation is Khorramshahr, and it was unveiled and test-fired in September 2017. Earlier test firing occurred in January 2017. According to IISS expert Dempsey, the missile looks very similar to Hwasong-10. It carries 1800 kg payload over 2000 km (Iran claims it has decreased missile size over the initial version, thus reducing propellant mass and range). Such a range covers targets not only in Israel, Egypt and Saudi Arabia, but even NATO members Romania, Bulgaria and Greece, if fired from Western Iran. Iran claims it can carry multiple warheads, most likely a reference to submunitions.

List of Hwasong-10 tests

Strategic implications
Currently, North Korea is also working on land based nuclear deterrents that are of Intercontinental range, such as KN-08, KN-14 (Upgraded version of KN-08). It is also working a sea-based nuclear deterrent, such as Pukkuksong-1 SLBM.

North Korea is confirmed to have successfully launched a KN-11 missile in a full test flight in a lofted trajectory and expecting KN-11 to be operationally deployed as early as before 2017 by South Korea military source in 25 Aug 2016.

In May 2017 North Korea successfully tested a new missile, the Hwasong-12, with a similar range to the Hwasong-10. A new missile had been displayed in the April 2017 military parade on the Hwasong-10 mobile launcher, and the Hwasong-12 may be intended to replace the Hwasong-10 which has been shown unreliable during its test programme. The Hwasong-10 was not shown in the February 2018 military parade, suggesting again that the design had not been deployed.

Description and technical specifications

Hwasong-10
 Launch weight: about 20 tons (est.)
 Diameter: 1.5 m
 Total Length: 12 m
 Payload: 1,000–1,250 kg (est.)
 Warhead: single
 Maximum range: 2,500–4,000 km (est.)
 CEP: 1.3 km
 Launch platform: North Korean-produced TEL, resembling a stretched and modified MAZ-543

Operators

Current operators
 : According to one source, more than 200; other source claims 12 deployed. 16 were seen at once during the October 10, 2010 Military Parade, although experts contacted by the Washington Post believed these were mock-ups of the missile.

Suspected operators
 : 19, according to a leaked, classified U.S. State Department cable, although Iran has not displayed the missiles until 2017 causing some U.S. intelligence officials to doubt the missiles were transferred to Iran.

Section 25 of this leaked cable (written before the 10 October 2010 appearance of the missile) says:
Russia said that during its presentations in Moscow and its
comments thus far during the current talks, the U.S. has
discussed the BM-25 as an existing system.  Russia questioned
the basis for this assumption and asked for any facts the
U.S. had to provide its existence such as launches, photos,
etc.  For Russia, the BM-25 is a mysterious missile.  North
Korea has not conducted any tests of this missile, but the
U.S. has said that North Korea transferred 19 of these
missiles to Iran.  It is hard for Russia to follow the logic
trail on this.  Since Russia has not seen any evidence of
this missile being developed or tested, it is hard for Russia
to imagine that Iran would buy an untested system.  Russia
does not understand how a deal would be made for an untested
missile.  References to the missile's existence are more in
the domain of political literature than technical fact.  In
short, for Russia, there is a question about the existence of
this system.

Iran displayed the Khorramshahr missile 22 September 2017, claiming its range to be 1240 miles.

See also 
R-27 Zyb
Pukkuksong-1
JL-1
KN-08

References

External links
Missile Threat CSIS - Musudan (BM-25)
R-27, astronautix.com
R-27, Globalsecurity.org

Ballistic missiles of North Korea
Ballistic missiles of Iran
Intermediate-range ballistic missiles of North Korea

it:SS-N-6 Serb